Shuriken School is an animated series that first aired on August 20, 2006. It was produced by Xilam Animation and Zinkia Entertainment in association with France 3 and Jetix Europe.

Characters

 Eizan Kaburagi is an only child, 10 years old, raised in a working-class family from Tokirohama. Eizan is intelligent, hardworking, and eager to learn. His sole aim since childhood has been to become a ninja and to avoid selling rice balls. His signature weapon is a green plastic ruler. He is clumsy, as shown in the episode "Phantom of the Kabuki".
 Jimmy B. comes from a comfortable New York family, but pretends to be much more streetwise than his true origins. He spent all his time with his rap gang, developing a real talent for break-dancing. His parents, perplexed and fed up with their neighbors' comments, sent him to Tokirohama to stay with his aunt and uncle. Before coming to Shuriken, he went to Katana school, Shuriken's rival school, but was kicked out after a week. His weapon is a skateboard.
 Okuni Dohan is the sole female member of the main group, and the most well-studied of them. She frequently cites examples from important lessons, and possesses great deductive skills and origami talent. There is also hinted rivalry between Okuni and Ami. Her primary weapon of choice is a jumprope.

Voice cast

French-language version 
Hélène Bizot - Eizan Kaburagi
Sophie Arthuys - Jimmy B.
Emilie Rault - Okuni Dohan
Pierre Baton - Principal Sensei, Zumichito
Isabelle Volpe - Jacques Morimura
Stéphanie Lafforge - Choki
Sauvane Delanoë - Marcos Gonsales, Daisuke Togakame
Ariane Aggiage - Kita Shunai, Nobunaga
Bruno Magne - Vladimir « Vlad » Keitawa
Denis Laustriat - Kubo Utamaro
Philippe Valmont - Tetsuo Matsura
Brigitte Lecordier - Kimura Twins
Jean-Claude Donda - Naginata, Yota Suguimura, Cleaning Lady
Benjamin Pascal - Bruce Chang
Pascal Massix - Principal of Katana

English-language version 
 Nathan Kress - Eizan, Jacques, Choki, Marcos
 Charlie Adler - Vladimir, Principal of Shuriken, Tetsuo, Principal of Katana, Cleaning Lady
 Jessica DiCicco - Okuni, Ami, Kita, Kimura Twins, Yota
 Maurice LaMarche - Daisuke, Naginata, Kubo, Zumichito
 Kimberly Brooks - Jimmy, Nobunaga, Bruce Chang

Episodes

Home video
In the United States, the entire series was released onto DVD on August 12, 2014 from Cinedigm.

Movie
An animated film, entitled Shuriken School: The Ninja's Secret (also known as The Ninja's Secret: A Shuriken School Adventure), has been produced by Xilam. It aired on 21 December 2007 on Disney Channel Asia. In the US, it was released onto DVD on April 15, 2014 from Cinedigm.

Plot

"The plot of Shuriken: the Movie follows lead protagonists Eizan, Jimmy and Okuni during the summer holidays. The three friends soon engage an interesting albeit dangerous struggle for reputation, family, and a whole lot more when Eizan's dad is kidnapped by professional ninjas. Upon setting out to find and rescue Eizan's father, the kids must employ the skills and techniques they studied so fervently during their first year of ninja training. Things are difficult however, when they learn that the Jade Shuriken, an ancient symbol of extreme ninja power, threatens Eizan's dreams and potential to become a true ninja. A series of events unravel as Eizan strives to clear his name, realize his dreams and secure his place at Shuriken School."

Voice cast
 Nathan Kress - Eizan
 Charlie Adler - Vladimir, Principal of Shuriken, Tetsuo, Principal of Katana, Eizan's Father
 Jessica DiCicco - Okuni, Ami
 Kimberly Brooks - Jimmy, Nobunaga, Bruce Chang, Eizan's mother
 Maurice LaMarche - Daisuke, Naginata, Kubo, Zumichito
 Billy West (uncredited) - additional voices

References

External links
 Xilam Shuriken School website
 Zinkia Shuriken School website
 

French flash animated television series
Spanish flash animated television series
Jetix original programming
Xilam
YTV (Canadian TV channel) original programming
Ninja fiction
Anime-influenced Western animated television series
2000s French animated television series
2006 French television series debuts
2007 French television series endings
French children's animated action television series
French children's animated adventure television series
French children's animated comedy television series
Spanish children's animated action television series
Spanish children's animated adventure television series
Spanish children's animated comedy television series
2006 Spanish television series debuts
2007 Spanish television series endings
Animated television series about children